Cienfuegos Bay is a bay in the Caribbean Sea located in Cienfuegos Province on the southern coast of Cuba. It has served as a harbor for boats for many years. It has two of the most important ports in the country, one of which is the city of Cienfuegos, the capital of the province.

History
On his second voyage to the Americas, Christopher Columbus visited the bay in 1494. The first permanent settlements occurred in 1738. The Jagua Fortress was erected by King Philip V of Spain in 1742 to protect the bay from pirates who prowled the Caribbean coast in those days. They used it as refuge at landfall, on their way to the city of Cienfuegos.

References

Bays of Cuba
Geography of Cuba
Geography of Cienfuegos Province